Ballarawad is a village in Dharwad district of Karnataka, India. Ballarawad village is administered by a Sarpanch, who is the elected representative of the village.

Demographics 
As of the 2011 Census of India there were 300 households in Ballarawad and a total population of 1,599 consisting of 787 males and 812 females. There were 195 children ages 0-6.

References

Villages in Dharwad district